The Changan CS75 is a compact crossover produced by Changan Automobile. Debuted during the 2013 Guangzhou Auto Show and launched on the Chinese auto market in 2014, the original Changan CS75 received a facelift in 2018 and an additional PHEV model in the same year. The Changan CS75 Plus debuted on the 2019 Shanghai Auto Show and was launched on the Chinese auto market in 2019 while the original CS75 model remains in production and on the market. As of November 2020, the "Millionth Edition" first generation CS75 based on the 2018 facelift model was announced. The second generation CS75 Plus was introduced for the 2022 model year with updated powertrain and revised design.



First generation (2013)

The Changan CS75 debuted on the 2013 Guangzhou Auto Show and was launched on the Chinese auto market in 2014. Pricing for the CS75 ranges from 108,800 yuan to 143,800 yuan slotting above the compact Changan CS55 and the mid-size Changan CS95.  

Both engines are mated to a 6-speed manual transmission or a 6-speed automatic transmission.

The CS75 will also be available in Europe as well, as an important part of Changan’s product line in Europe that will also include the Changan Eado sedan and  CS35 subcompact crossover.

Pricing of the CS75 in Europe will start around 20,000 Euro.

2018 facelift
A facelift was revealed during the 2018 Beijing Auto Show updating the front bumper, front grilles, and connected tail lamps.

CS75 PHEV
A plug-in hybrid version was also available based on the post-facelift CS75, with deliveries for the Changan CS75 PHEV starting in September 2018.

CS75 Blue Whale Edition
In October 2022, the original CS75 received an update called the CS75 Blue Whale Edition. The Blue Whale Edition is based on the 2018 facelift while featuring a redesigned front bumper. The CS75 Blue Whale Edition is equipped with the of Blue Whale NE1.5 liter turbocharged engine with a maximum power of 180 horsepower and a peak torque of 300 Nm, matched with a 6-speed manual transmission or a 7-speed wet dual-clutch gearbox.

Changan CS75 Plus (2019)

The Changan CS75 Plus debuted on the 2019 Shanghai Auto Show and was launched on the Chinese auto market in 2019. The CS75 Plus is available with a 1.5-litre turbo engine producing  horsepower labeled 280T, and a sportier 2.0-litre turbo engine model producing  labeled 360T.  The CS75 Plus will be sold alongside its predecessor, with the CS75 being positioned sightly lower in the product range.

Second generation CS75 Plus (2022)

An updated model dubbed the second generation CS75 Plus was introduced for the 2022 model year, selling alongside the first generation model which was also updated for the 2022 model year with updated engine options and the regular CS75 models. The second generation CS75 Plus features redesigned front and rear end while retaining the side profile of the original CS75 Plus, essentially being an extensive facelift.

Both engines are mated into an 8-speed automatic transmission being as only sole gearbox option.

References

External links

  (CS75)
  (CS75 PHEV)

CS75
Crossover sport utility vehicles
Cars of China
Cars introduced in 2013